Mohamed Mrabet (born 1 January 1990) is a Tunisian sprint canoeist. At the 2012 Summer Olympics, he competed in the men's K-1 200 metres and 1000 metres.  At the 2016 Olympics, he competed in the men's K-1 1000 metres. At the 2020 Summer Olympics, he competed in the men's K-1 1000 metres.

References

External links

Tunisian male canoeists
Living people
1990 births
Olympic canoeists of Tunisia
Canoeists at the 2012 Summer Olympics
Canoeists at the 2016 Summer Olympics
Canoeists at the 2020 Summer Olympics
Competitors at the 2013 Mediterranean Games
Competitors at the 2018 Mediterranean Games
Competitors at the 2019 African Games
African Games gold medalists for Tunisia
African Games silver medalists for Tunisia
African Games medalists in canoeing
Mediterranean Games competitors for Tunisia
20th-century Tunisian people
21st-century Tunisian people